Miss Venezuela 2009 was the 56th Miss Venezuela pageant, was held at the Poliedro de Caracas in Caracas, Venezuela, on September 24, 2009. Stefanía Fernández, Miss Venezuela 2008 and Miss Universe 2009, crowned Miss Miranda, Marelisa Gibson, as her successor at the end of the event.

The Miss World Venezuela title went to Miss Zulia, Adriana Vasini while Elizabeth Mosquera, Miss Trujillo, obtained the title of Miss Venezuela International. The 1st Runner Up Mariángela Bonanni was appointed as Miss Venezuela Earth.

It was on that year that the present MV anthem was sung for the first time, with a new melody replacing the iconic tune used for 34 years, with a slight change in lyrics.

Results 
Color key

Delegates

References

External links
Miss Venezuela official website

2009 in Venezuela
2009 beauty pageants